{{Album ratings
| rev1      = AllMusic
| rev1Score =  <ref>{{AllMusic |class=album |id=r149751 |tab=review |label=Grover Washington Jr.: Skylarkin > Review |first=All |last=Music |accessdate=13 October 2011}}</ref>
| rev2      = The Rolling Stone Jazz Record Guide
| rev2Score = 
}}Skylarkin''' is a 1980 studio album by American jazz saxophonist Grover Washington Jr. The record was released via Motown label.

Reception
A reviewer of Dusty Groove wrote "Sweet Motown grooving from Grover Washington – a set that has him working with slightly larger backings than his Kudu years, but in a way that still lets his soulful horn stand strongly out front! As always, Washington is a killer talent on the soprano sax – able to inflect the instrument with these soulful twists and turns that he virtually invented at the time, and which so many others have tried to copy over the years. Yet the set also has Grover on a bit of tenor and baritone sax, too – plus some flute – all over arrangements mostly handled by the man himself, with a bit of help from William Eaton".

Track listing
"Easy Loving You" - 7:17	
"Bright Moments" (Roland Kirk) - 6:25
"Snake Eyes" - 4:25	
"I Can't Help It" (Stevie Wonder, Susaye Greene) - 6:26
"Love" (Ralph MacDonald, William Salter, David Stevens) - 5:18
"Open Up Your Mind (Wide)" (Ronnie Wilson, Charlie Wilson) - 6:06 

All tunes written by Grover Washington Jr. except as noted parenthetically above.

 Personnel Band Grover Washington Jr. – soprano saxophone, tenor saxophone, baritone saxophone, flute, Prophet-5, ocarina, arrangements (1, 2, 3)
 Richard Tee – acoustic piano, electric piano
 Eric Gale – guitars 
 Marcus Miller – bass
 Idris Muhammad – drums
 Ralph MacDonald – percussion, SyndrumsAdditional musicians'''
 Jon Faddis – flugelhorn (1)
 Alex Otey – trumpet (1)
 Jorge Dalto – acoustic piano solo (2)
 Paul Griffin – clavinet (3)
 Ed Walsh – Oberheim 8-Voice synthesizer (4)
 William Eaton – arrangements (4, 5, 6), conductor

Production 
 Grover Washington, Jr. – producer 
 Richard Alderson – engineer
 Ed Heath – assistant engineer 
 Anthony MacDonald – assistant engineer
 Lamont Moreno – assistant engineer
 George Marino – original mastering at Sterling Sound (New York, NY).
 John Matousek – CD mastering at Masterworks (Hollywood, CA).
 Scott Charles – production coordination
 Ginny Livingston – art direction, design
 John Cabalka – art direction, design
 Bill Imhoff – cover illustration

Charts

Singles

References

External links
 Grover Washington Jr. – Skylarkin' at Discogs

1980 albums
Motown albums
Grover Washington Jr. albums